The RISKS Digest or Forum On Risks to the Public in Computers and Related Systems is an online periodical published since 1985 by the Committee on Computers and Public Policy of the Association for Computing Machinery. The editor is Peter G. Neumann.

It is a moderated forum concerned with the security and safety of computers, software, and technological systems. Security, and risk, here are taken broadly; RISKS is concerned not merely with so-called security holes in software, but with unintended consequences and hazards stemming from the design (or lack thereof) of automated systems. Other recurring subjects include cryptography and the effects of technically ill-considered public policies. RISKS also publishes announcements and Calls for Papers from various technical conferences, and technical book reviews (usually by Rob Slade, though occasionally by others).

Although RISKS is a forum of a computer science association, most contributions are readable and informative to anyone with an interest in the subject. It is heavily read by system administrators, and computer security managers, as well as computer scientists and engineers.

The RISKS Digest is published on a frequent but irregular schedule through the moderated Usenet newsgroup comp.risks, which exists solely to carry the Digest.

Summaries of the forum appear as columns edited by Neumann in the ACM SIGSOFT Software Engineering Notes (SEN) and the Communications of the ACM (CACM).

References

External links
 RISKS Digest web archive
 RISKS Digest (Usenet newsgroup comp.risks)
 Google groups interface to comp.risks

Risk
Safety engineering
Computer security procedures
Magazines established in 1985
Association for Computing Machinery magazines
Professional and trade magazines
SRI International
Engineering magazines
Irregularly published magazines published in the United States
1985 establishments in the United States